Prophet of the Last Eclipse is the second album in a trilogy by Luca Turilli's eponymous band. It was released on November 26, 2002, by Limb Music Productions. The ten tracks tell a story about the world Zaephyr and its destruction. Luca was inspired to make this album due to his love of science fiction films, in particular, Event Horizon. At the end, Turilli mentions that the story is 'to be continued', however, the story is not continued on The Infinite Wonders of Creation.

Track listing

Personnel
Luca Turilli — lead guitars
Olaf Hayer — lead vocals
Sascha Paeth — bass
Miro — keyboards
Robert Hunecke-Rizzo — drums, rhythm guitars

Collaborations
Andre Matos
Amanda Somerville

Charts

References

2002 albums
Luca Turilli albums
Rock operas
Concept albums
Limb Music albums